The West Indies cricket team toured Australia from November 1988 to February 1989 and played 5 Test matches against Australia.  West Indies won the series 3-1 with one match drawn.

In addition, the teams played in a triangular Limited Overs International (LOI) tournament which also includes Pakistan. The West Indies won this tournament after defeating Australia in best of 3-finals by 2-1.

Test series summary

1st Test

2nd Test

3rd Test

4th Test

5th Test

Benson & Hedges World Series
The Benson & Hedges World Series Cup  was a tri-nation (ODI) series held in Australia from 10 December 1988 till 18 January 1989. It was held between Australia, West Indies, Pakistan. The tournament was played in Round-robin format in which Australia and West Indies reached the finals where West Indies won the best of 3-finals series by 2-1.

Desmond Haynes topped the batting list in the tournament with 513 runs (11 innings) at an average of 51.30, While Curtly Ambrose topped the bowling list with 21 wickets (10 innings) at an average of 15.90

Notes

References

External sources
 CricketArchive

1988 in Australian cricket
1988 in West Indian cricket
1988–89 Australian cricket season
1989 in Australian cricket
1989 in West Indian cricket
International cricket competitions from 1988–89 to 1991
1988-89